WRMI (Radio Miami International) is a shortwave radio station broadcasting from Okeechobee, Florida, United States. WRMI is a commercial radio station that sells airtime to businesses and organizations.

Programming
WRMI relays several international news stations including Radio Ukraine International, Radio Slovakia International, Radio Tirana, Radio France International, Famagusta Gazette Radio, Radio Prague, the Italian Broadcasting Corporation, NHK World Radio Japan, Radio Taiwan International, and Radiodifusión Argentina al Exterior, all of which, except for the last, would otherwise be difficult to receive in the Western Hemisphere. It also features headline news stories from the Voice of America, several religious programs (particularly those of Brother Stair and Ching Hai), as well as original and syndicated programs.  According to its 1996 station record from the Federal Communications Commission, WRMI's broadcast target zones were the Caribbean, Central America and South America. In particular, much of its programming was targeted towards Cuba. With the addition of the former WYFR transmitters, WRMI had 14 transmitters with 23 antennas targeting many zones worldwide in 2016. Its broadcasts are also easily received in the United States and Canada. WRMI airs programs in English, Spanish, French, Portuguese, Italian, Ukrainian, Russian and Slovak. Since March 2022, WRMI has targeted daily native language programming to Ukraine and Russia regarding the on-going Russian invasion of Ukraine.

WRMI Legends
In November 2022, WRMI added an evening block of personality oldies programming that had previously been aired on WTWW in Lebanon, Tennessee. The block, branded as "WRMI Legends," was forced off WTWW when that station shut down due to a number of factors earlier that month. WRMI Legends has operated on the 5050 kHz frequency, vacated by WWRB following the January 2022 death of its owner, since February 2023. WRMI Legends, like WTWW before it, largely targets a North American and European audience of DXers and Amateur Radio enthusiasts.

Mighty KBC
In January 2023, WRMI absorbed another block of personality music programming from German/Dutch shortwave broadcaster The Mighty KBC Radio, which was forced to suspend operations due to an energy crisis in Europe.

History 
The station began broadcasting on June 14, 1994, with a 50,000-watt transmitter and two antennas located near Miami, Florida. In December 2013, they purchased the WYFR transmission complex from Family Radio in Okeechobee, Florida. This new facility includes a dozen 100,000-watt transmitters plus two 50,000-watt transmitters and several antennas to cover all parts of the world.

Frequencies 
WRMI currently, as of February 2023, broadcasts on the following frequencies in the following directions:

References

External links 
 WRMI Listen live
 25th Anniversary of WRMI post in Facebook - November 2019

Shortwave radio stations in the United States
1994 establishments in Florida
Radio stations established in 1994